West Midlands Franchise may refer to:

 West Midlands Franchise, operated by London Midland between 2007 and 2017
 West Midlands Franchise, operated by West Midlands Trains since December 2017